"Wot Do U Call It?" is the debut single by British grime artist Wiley. It is the first single released from his first album Treddin' on Thin Ice (2004). It was released on 5 April 2004 for digital download and CD single.

Music video 
The music video consists mainly of Wiley around various streets and venues in his local area of East London, and was produced on a shoestring budget.

Track listings
 CD single
 "Wot Do U Call It?" – 3:20
 "Problems" – 3:49

Digital download – EP
 "Wot Do U Call It?"
 "Wot Do U Call It?" (instrumental)

Credits and personnel 
 Lead vocals – Wiley
 Producer – Wiley
 Lyrics – Richard Cowie
 Label: XL Recordings

Chart performance

Release history

References 

2004 debut singles
Wiley (musician) songs
2004 songs
XL Recordings singles
Songs written by Wiley (musician)